The Potomac Boat Club is a rowing club on the Potomac River in Washington, DC. The club provides a rowing hub for around 300 senior members, ranging in ability from recreational rowers to professional athletes.

The boat club hosts both private members, as well serving as a base for the Washington-Liberty High School crew team.

Boathouse
The club’s current building, a two story, wooden, craftsman style structure completed in 1908, was listed on the National Register of Historic Places in 1991

The facade of the club faces the Potomac River. The rear elevation faces K Street, which terminates at the Club. The first floor of the building is used for boat and oar storage. The second floor of the original building is broken into a ballroom, board room, and locker rooms. The second floor of the addition is used for additional locker rooms and a shop. The building was rehabilitated by Williams & Dynerman in 1989. 

Adjacent to the boathouse, the remaining abutment of the demolished Aqueduct Bridge provides shelter for rowing shells belonging to members of the club.

Notable club coaches and rowers
The history of the club is linked with a number of high profile coaches and athletes who have made significant contributions to the sport of competitive rowing. Charles E. Courtney served as club coach between 1881 and 1885, a controversial professional athlete, but later coach of the Cornell University’s men’s crew team that dominated the early years of competitive rowing in the Intercollegiate Rowing Association. Many decades later, Charlie Butt, head coach of the storied Washington-Liberty High School crew team was instrumental in promoting rowing as a school sport. The Charlie Butt Scullers’ Head of the Potomac Regatta continues to be held annually on the Potomac River for scholastic crews.

Potomac Boat Club members Larry Hough and Tony Johnson, won the silver medal in coxless pairs at the 1968 Olympics.

See also
 National Register of Historic Places listings in Washington, D.C.

References

External links

 

1859 establishments in the United States
Buildings and structures completed in 1908
Clubhouses on the National Register of Historic Places in Washington, D.C.
Georgetown (Washington, D.C.)
Rowing clubs in the United States